Brian Jephte Bayeye (born 30 June 2000) is a French professional footballer who plays as a midfielder for Italian  club Torino.

Club career
Bayeye started his career with French fifth tier side Troyes B. In 2019, he signed for Catanzaro in the Italian third tier. In 2022, Bayeye signed for Italian Serie A club Torino. On 6 August 2022, he debuted for Torino during a 3–0 cup win over Palermo.

International career
Bayeye was born in Paris to a DR Congolese family.

References

External links
 

2000 births
Living people
French sportspeople of Democratic Republic of the Congo descent
French footballers
Footballers from Paris
Association football midfielders
Championnat National 3 players
Serie C players
A.C. Carpi players
U.S. Catanzaro 1929 players
Torino F.C. players
Expatriate footballers in Italy
French expatriate sportspeople in Italy
French expatriate footballers